The Baldwin 0-6-6-0-1000/1DE  is a cab unit diesel-electric locomotive built by Baldwin Locomotive Works in 1945.

Original buyers

See also
 The Museum of the Moscow Railway, at Paveletsky Rail Terminal, Moscow
 Rizhsky Rail Terminal, Home of the Moscow Railway Museum
 Varshavsky Rail Terminal, St.Petersburg, Home of the Central Museum of Railway Transport, Russian Federation
 History of rail transport in Russia

References
 
 
Extra 2200 South Baldwin Tally part 1 by Dick Will pages 23–24 October November 1970.

External links
 Baldwin DRS-6-4-660
 Soviet Railways type Db Russian language

Дb
Дb
C-C locomotives
Baldwin locomotives
Railway locomotives introduced in 1945
5 ft gauge locomotives